Burke is a city in and county seat of Gregory County, South Dakota, United States. The population was 575 at the 2020 census.

History
Burke was laid out in 1904 and incorporated in 1906. It was named for congressman Charles H. Burke.

Geography
Burke is located at  (43.182992, -99.291065).

Burke has been assigned the ZIP code 57523 and the FIPS place code 08700.

Demographics

2010 census
As of the census of 2010, there were 604 people, 324 households, and 161 families residing in the city. The racial makeup of the city was 94.2% White, 0.2% African American, 3.5% Native American, 0.2% from other races, and 2.0% from two or more races. Hispanic or Latino of any race were 0.7% of the population.

There were 324 households, of which 19.4% had children under the age of 18 living with them, 42.9% were married couples living together, 4.6% had a female householder with no husband present, 2.2% had a male householder with no wife present, and 50.3% were non-families. 48.5% of all households were made up of individuals, and 27.8% had someone living alone who was 65 years of age or older. The average household size was 1.86 and the average family size was 2.62.

The median age in the city was 52.2 years. 17.9% of residents were under the age of 18; 3.9% were between the ages of 18 and 24; 18.3% were from 25 to 44; 30.4% were from 45 to 64; and 29.5% were 65 years of age or older. The gender makeup of the city was 44.5% male and 55.5% female.

2000 census
As of the census of 2000, there were 676 people, 327 households, and 177 families residing in the city. The population density was 1,210.1 people per square mile (466.1/km2). There were 385 housing units at an average density of 689.2 per square mile (265.4/km2). The racial makeup of the city was 97.49% White, 1.78% Native American, and 0.74% from two or more races.

There were 327 households, out of which 22.3% had children under the age of 18 living with them, 47.4% were married couples living together, 4.9% had a female householder with no husband present, and 45.6% were non-families. 44.3% of all households were made up of individuals, and 30.0% had someone living alone who was 65 years of age or older. The average household size was 2.03 and the average family size was 2.85.

In the city, the population was spread out, with 21.7% under the age of 18, 3.8% from 18 to 24, 20.4% from 25 to 44, 23.1% from 45 to 64, and 30.9% who were 65 years of age or older. The median age was 48 years. For every 100 females, there were 77.9 males. For every 100 females age 18 and over, there were 74.0 males.

The median income for a household in the city was $23,056, and the median income for a family was $32,333. Males had a median income of $23,438 versus $19,250 for females. The per capita income for the city was $14,210. About 7.2% of families and 15.7% of the population were below the poverty line, including 12.9% of those under age 18 and 22.5% of those age 65 or over.

Education
Burke Public Schools are part of the Burke School District. The district has one elementary school, one middle school, and one high school. Students attend Burke High School.

Notable people
 Kathy Lou Schultz - American poet and scholar
 Julie Bartling - South Dakota State Senator
 Billie Sutton, State Senator and 2018 candidate for Governor

See also
 List of cities in South Dakota

References

External links

 The Burke Gazette - local newspaper

Cities in South Dakota
Cities in Gregory County, South Dakota
County seats in South Dakota
Populated places established in 1904
1904 establishments in South Dakota